Pat Gannon (born 25 September 1958) is an Irish rower. He competed in the men's coxless pair event at the 1980 Summer Olympics.

References

External links
 

1958 births
Living people
Irish male rowers
Olympic rowers of Ireland
Rowers at the 1980 Summer Olympics
Place of birth missing (living people)